Carsten Ball and Matt Reid were the defending champions but chose not to defend their title.

Brydan Klein and Dane Propoggia won the title after defeating Steven de Waard and Luke Saville 6–3, 6–4 in the final.

Seeds

Draw

References
 Main Draw

Burnie International - Men's Doubles
Burnie International